Worth Dying For may refer to:
 The former name of Fearless BND, American Christian band
 Worth Dying For (album), 2008 album by the above
 Worth Dying For (novel), 2010 novel by Lee Child
 Worth Dying For (non-fiction book), 2016 book on flags by Tim Marshall